"Data de Groove" is a song by Falco from his 1990 studio album Data de Groove. The song was also released as a single, it was the first single from the album.

Background and writing 
The song was written by Robert Ponger and Falco. They are also credited as the producers.

Commercial performance 
The song reached no. 12 in Austria.

Track listings 
7" single GIG 111 227 (1990, Austria)
7" single Teldec 9031-71518-7 (1990, Austria)
Side 1. "Data De Groove" (3:59)
Side 2. "Data De Groove" (Human Version) (3:59)
 		 	 
12" maxi single Teldec 715-19-0 (1990)
 A. "Data De Groove" (Club Mix) (6:48)
 B1. "Data De Groove" (Digital-Analogue Version) (3:59)
 B2. "Data De Groove" (Instrumental Version) (4:57)

Charts

References

External links 
 Falco – "Data de Groove" at Discogs

1990 songs
1990 singles
Falco (musician) songs
Songs written by Falco (musician)
Songs written by Robert Ponger